Kalarcheh Shureh (also Romanized as Kalārcheh Shūreh; also known as Kalehchah Shūreh) is a village in Zirtang Rural District, Kunani District, Kuhdasht County, Lorestan Province, Iran. At the 2006 census, its population was 121, in 27 families.

References 

Towns and villages in Kuhdasht County